Scott Andrew Summers (born in Decatur, Illinois in 1967) is an American scientist and professor at the University of Utah. He co-founded Centaurus Therapeutics, a biotechnology company that is developing novel ceramide-reducing therapies to treat cardiometabolic disease.

Education
Summers completed his BS degree at Indiana University, PhD at Southern Illinois University, and postdoctoral fellowship at the University of Pennsylvania.

Career

Summers is known for discovering that a class of fat metabolites termed ceramides contribute to the tissue dysfunction that underlies diabetes and its comorbidities. Though the idea was initially controversial, it has gained traction within the medical community, to the extent that blood ceramides are now measured clinically as markers of cardiometabolic disease risk.

After running laboratories in Singapore and Australia for 8 years, Summers returned to the USA and the University of Utah in 2016 to chair a new Department of Nutrition and Integrative Physiology and serve as the Co-Director (with Jared Rutter, HHMI) of the Utah Diabetes and Metabolism Research Center. Summers was named William J. Rutter, PhD, Presidential Endowed Chair of Biochemistry in 2021 and a University of Utah Distinguished Professor in 2022.

Selected publications 
Tippetts TS, Holland WL, Summers SA (2021) Cholesterol, the Devil you Know; Ceramide, the Devil you Don’t. Trends in Pharmacological Sciences 42 (12), 1082-1095
Summers SA (2018) Could ceramides become the new cholesterol? Cell Metabolism 27(2):276-280
Chaurasia B, Tippetts T, Monibas R, Liu J. Li Y, Wang L, Wilkerson J, Sweeney C.R, Pereira R, Sumida D, Maschek J. A., Cox J, Kaddai V, Lancaster G, Siddique M, Poss A, Pearson M, Satapati S, Zhou H, McLaren D, Previs S, Chen Y, Qian Y, Petrov A, Wu M, Shen X, Yao J, Nunes C, Howard A, Wang L, Erion M,  Rutter J, Holland W, Kelley D, and Summers S. A. (2019) Targeting a Ceramide Double Bond Improves Insulin Resistance and Hepatic Steatosis. Science 365, 386-392
Holland WL, Brozinick JT, Wang LP, Hawkins ED, Sargent KM, Liu Y, Narra K, Hoehn KL, Knotts TA, Siesky A, Nelson DH, Karathanasis SK, Fontenot GK, Birnbaum MJ and Summers SA (2007) Inhibition of ceramide synthesis ameliorates glucocorticoid-, saturated-fat-, and obesity-induced insulin resistance. Cell Metabolism 5(3), 167-79

References

External links 

1967 births
Living people
University of Utah faculty